Rebeca Supipi Vandort (born 27 January 1994) is a Sri Lankan cricketer. In October 2018, she was named in Sri Lanka's squad for the 2018 ICC Women's World Twenty20 tournament in the West Indies.

References

1994 births
Living people
Sri Lankan women cricketers
Sri Lanka women One Day International cricketers
Sri Lanka women Twenty20 International cricketers
Cricketers from Colombo